Theodelinda also spelled Theudelinde ( 570–628 AD), was a queen of the Lombards by marriage to two consecutive Lombard rulers, Autari and then Agilulf, and regent of Lombardia during the minority of her son Adaloald, and co-regent when he reached majority, from 616 to 626. For well over thirty years, she exercised influence across the Lombard realm, which comprised most of Italy between the Apennines and the Alps. Born a Frankish Catholic, she convinced her first spouse Autari to convert from pagan beliefs to Christianity.

Life
She was the daughter of duke Garibald I of Bavaria and Waldrada.
Born a Bavarian princess to King Garibald, Theodelinda's heritage included being descended on her mother's side from the previous Lombard king, Waco, whose family had ruled seven generations prior according tradition.

First marriage
Theodelinda was married first in 588 to Authari, king of the Lombards, son of King Cleph. There are indications that Pope Gregory I may have had an interest in encouraging this marriage as it would tie a Bavarian Catholic with the Arian Lombards, something he did previously, when he promoted the marriage between the Frankish princess Bertha—great-granddaughter of Clovis I—and the Kentish Aethelbehrt. Theodelinda's time with Authari was brief for he died in 590.

Second marriage

So highly esteemed across the Lombard kingdom was Theodelinda that when Authari died, she was asked to remain in power and to choose a successor. Historian Roger Collins has misgivings with the reliability of this claim—which stems from Paul the Deacon—and instead, asserts that both political bargaining or naked force were more likely attributable to her choice. Whatever the real situation, a mere two months after Authari's death, Theodelinda picked Agilulf as her next husband and the two were wed. She thereafter exerted much influence in restoring Nicene Christianity to a position of primacy in Italy against its rival, Arian Christianity. Her reach extended across most of the Italian peninsula between the Apennines and the Alps.

While her husband Agilulf retained his Arian faith, he allowed his son with Theodelinda to be baptized a Catholic. The Lombard king faced trouble from his dukes, who were convinced that he had consigned himself instead to the faith of the conquered. Agilulf did not permit Theodelinda's faith to shape his policies against the Byzantines.  Frequently, Theodelinda corresponded with Pope Gregory (590–604) in letters, some of which are recorded by the eighth-century historian, Paul the Deacon. Some of the content in these letters concerned her husband's conversion. To further promulgate the Christian faith of the Catholics, she also welcomed Catholic missionaries across her realm. Taking full advantage of her piety and possibly to incentivize her continued Catholic proclivities, Pope Gregory sent her a series of silver ampullas of Syro-Palestinian craftsmanship, a gospel casket, and a golden cross from Byzantium. The cross was gem-encrusted and was meant as a symbol of the "impending Kingdom of God".

Regent
Shortly before Agilulf's death in 616, he named Theodelinda co-regent for their son Adaloald and once he reached maturity, she remained co-ruler over the kingdom.

For a period of some thirty-five years Theodelinda was queen of the Lombards. Perhaps to further exhibit her faith, she constructed a Catholic cathedral dedicated to St. John the Baptist at Monza (near Milan) and richly endowed it. Her support for the Catholic faith also included the establishment of monasteries—one at Bobbio, and later one at Pedona, among others according to Paul the Deacon.

Within "the treasure house" that is the cathedral at Monza, one finds a splendidly detailed sculpture of a mother hen and her chicks made of gilded silver, which was likely another gift from Pope Gregory.

Notes

References

Citations

Bibliography

External links
 Queens of Italy – Women in Power in Medieval Italy: Theodelinda

570 births
628 deaths
6th-century Lombard people
7th-century Lombard people
Lombardic queens consort
Bavarian dynasty
People from Monza
People from Brianza
Remarried royal consorts
6th-century Italian women
7th-century Italian women
7th-century women rulers
German female regents